The First Lord of the Admiralty, or formally the Office of the First Lord of the Admiralty, was the political head of the English and later British Royal Navy. He was the government's senior adviser on all naval affairs, responsible for the direction and control of the Admiralty, and also of general administration of the Naval Service of the Kingdom of England, Great Britain in the 18th century, and then the United Kingdom, including the Royal Navy, the Royal Marines, and other services. It was one of the earliest known permanent government posts. Apart from being the political head of the Naval Service the post holder was simultaneously the pre-eminent member of the Board of Admiralty. The office of First Lord of the Admiralty existed from 1628 until it was abolished when the Admiralty, Air Ministry, Ministry of Defence and War Office were all merged to form the new Ministry of Defence in 1964. Its modern-day equivalent is the Secretary of State for Defence.

History 

The first such First Lord of the Admiralty was Richard Weston, 1st Earl of Portland, who was appointed in 1628.  The First Lord was not always a permanent member of the board until the Admiralty Department was established as an official government department in 1709 with the First Lord as its head; it replaced the earlier Office of the Admiralty and Marine Affairs. During most of the 17th century and the early 18th century, it was not invariable for the Admiralty to be in commission, so there are gaps in the list of First Lords, and a small number of First Lords were for a time Lord High Admiral.

After the Revolution, in 1690, a declaratory Act was passed, during the reign of William and Mary. Parliament passed the Admiralty Act, vesting in the Commissioners the powers formerly held by the Lord High Admiral of England. and at this point became a permanent Cabinet position.

The Admiralty Commission was dissolved in 1701, but was reconstituted in 1709 on the death of Prince George of Denmark, who had been appointed Lord High Admiral.  The office has been held in commission from that time onwards, however, except for a short period (1827–28) when the Duke of Clarence was Lord High Admiral. The Board of the Admiralty comprised a number of "Lords Commissioners" headed by a First Lord.

From the early 1800s the post was always held by a civilian (previously flag officers of the Royal Navy also held the post). In 1832 First Lord Sir James Graham instituted reforms and amalgamated the Board of Admiralty and the Navy Board. By the provisions of the Admiralty Act of 1832, two Lords in committee could legalise any action of the Board.

In 1868 Prime Minister, William Gladstone appointed Hugh Childers First Lord, who would introduce a new system at the Admiralty. However these changes restricted communication between the board members who were affected by these new regulations, and the sittings of the Board were discontinued altogether.

The responsibility and powers of the First Lord of the Admiralty were laid down by an Order in Council dated 14 January 1869, and a later Order (19 March 1872) made the First Lord responsible to the Sovereign and to Parliament for all the business of the Admiralty. However, by describing the Lords of the Admiralty as the "assistants" of the First Lord, and by specifically defining their duties, this had, in fact, partially disabled the collective power of the Board.

In 1931, for the first time since 1709, the First Lord was not a member of the cabinet.

In 1946, the three posts of Secretary of State for War, First Lord of the Admiralty, and Secretary of State for Air became formally subordinated to that of Minister of Defence, which had itself been created in 1940 for the co-ordination of defence and security issues.

In 1964, the office of First Lord of the Admiralty was abolished, the last holder being the second Earl Jellicoe, whose father, Admiral of the Fleet the first Earl Jellicoe, had served as First Sea Lord nearly 50 years earlier. The functions of the Lords Commissioners were then transferred to an Admiralty Board, which forms part of the tri-service Defence Council of the United Kingdom.

List of First Lords of the Admiralty

First Lords of the Admiralty of England (1628–1701)

Senior Members of the Lord High Admiral's Council (1702–1709)

First Lords of the Admiralty of Great Britain (1709–1801)

First Lords of the Admiralty of the United Kingdom (1801–1964) 

From 1 April 1964 Elizabeth II assumed the title of Lord High Admiral. Ministerial responsibility for the Royal Navy was transferred to the newly created Secretary of State for Defence.

Notes:

Boards, departments and offices under the First Lord 
 Admiralty and Marine Affairs Office, (1628–1709)
 Admiralty Department, (1709–1964)
 Board of Admiralty, (1628–1964)
 Navy Board, (1628–1832)
 Sick and Hurt Board, (1653–1806)
 Transport Board, (1690–1724, 1794–1817)
 Victualling Board, (1683–1832)
 Office of the Civil Lord of the Admiralty
 Office of the Senior Naval Lord, (1689–1771)
 Office of the First Naval Lord, (1771–1904)
 Office of the First Sea Lord, (1904–1917)
 Office of the First Sea Lord and Chief of Naval Staff, (1917–1964)
 Office of the Private Secretary to the First Lord of the Admiralty, (1800–1910)
 Office of the Naval Secretary, (1910–1964)
 Office of the Secretary to the Admiralty, (1660–1763)
 Office of the First Secretary to the Admiralty, (1763–1871)
 Office of the Parliamentary Secretary to the Admiralty, (1871–1886)
 Office of the Parliamentary and Financial Secretary to the Admiralty, (1886–1959)
 Office of the Permanent Secretary to the Admiralty, (1882–1964)

Fictional First Lords 

The "Radical" First Lord, and a major character, in Gilbert and Sullivan's comic opera H.M.S. Pinafore (1878), is Sir Joseph Henry Porter, KCB.  W. S. Gilbert wrote to Arthur Sullivan he did not intend to portray the real-life then First Lord, the bookseller and newsagent W. H. Smith, a Conservative, although some of the public, including Prime Minister Disraeli (who later referred to Smith as "Pinafore Smith"), identified Porter with him. The counterparts shared a known lack of naval background.  It has been suggested the character was drawn on Smith's actual "Radical" predecessor of 1868–71, Hugh Childers.

References

Attribution 
 This article contains some text from: Vesey, Richard Sir, Admiral, (1896), Naval Administration: The Constitution, Character, and Functions of the Board of Admiralty, and of the Civil Departments it Directs, George Bell and Sons, London.

Sources 
 Bell, Christopher M. "Sir John Fisher’s Naval Revolution Reconsidered: Winston Churchill at the Admiralty, 1911–1914." War in History 18.3 (2011): 333–356. online
 Hamilton, C. I. (2011). The Making of the Modern Admiralty: British Naval Policy-Making, 1805–1927. Cambridge: Cambridge University Press. .
 Rodger, N. A. M., The Admiralty (Lavenham, 1979)
 Sainty, J. C. Admiralty Officials, 1660–1870 (London, 1975)

Admiralty
 
Admiralty
Lists of admirals
Royal Navy
Royal Navy appointments
1628 establishments in England
1964 disestablishments in the United Kingdom
Defunct ministerial offices in the United Kingdom